TTDI Jaya is a major township in Shah Alam, Selangor, Malaysia. TTDI stands for Taman Tun Dr. Ismail.

Townships in Selangor